Brownlow Cecil, 2nd Marquess of Exeter  (2 July 1795 – 16 January 1867), styled Lord Burghley until 1804, was a British peer, courtier, and Tory politician. He held office under the Earl of Derby as Lord Chamberlain of the Household in 1852 and as Lord Steward of the Household between 1858 and 1859.

Background
Exeter was the eldest son of Henry Cecil, 1st Marquess of Exeter, and his second wife Sarah, daughter of Thomas Hoggins. His mother died shortly before his second birthday and in 1804 he succeeded to the marquessate, aged eight, on the death of his father.

A keen cricketer who was associated with Marylebone Cricket Club (MCC), prior to his political career he appeared in a first-class match in 1817 for W. Ward's XI against E. H. Budd's XI at Lord's. He made scores of 1 and 4 not out in the match.

Political career
Exeter held office in the first two Tory administrations of the Earl of Derby, first as Lord Chamberlain of the Household between February and December 1852, and later as Lord Steward of the Household from 1858 to 1859. Apart from his political career, he was also Lord Lieutenant of Rutland between 1826 and 1867 and of Northamptonshire between 1842 and 1867, and Groom of the Stole to the Prince Consort between 1841 and 1846. He was made a Knight of the Garter in 1827 and admitted to the Privy Council in 1841.

Family

Lord Exeter married Isabella Poyntz, one of the two daughters and co-heiresses of William Stephen Poyntz, on 12 May 1824. They had seven children:

William Alleyne Cecil, 3rd Marquess of Exeter (1825–1895)
Colonel Lord Brownlow Thomas Montague Cecil (1827–1905)
Lady Mary Frances Cecil (1832–1917), married Dudley Ryder, 3rd Earl of Harrowby
Commander Lord Edward Henry Cecil (1834–1862)
Lord Henry Poyntz Cecil (1837–1858)
Lord Adelbert Percy Cecil (1841–1889), member of the Plymouth Brethren
Lady Victoria Cecil (1843–1932), married William Charles Evans-Freke, 8th Baron Carbery

Lord Exeter died in January 1867, aged 71, and was succeeded in his titles by his eldest son William. The Marchioness of Exeter died in March 1879, aged 76.

References

External links

1795 births
1867 deaths
Barons Burghley
Brownlow Cecil, 2nd Marquess of Exeter
Alumni of St John's College, Cambridge
Knights of the Garter
Lord-Lieutenants of Northamptonshire
Lord-Lieutenants of Rutland
English cricketers
English cricketers of 1787 to 1825
Presidents of the Marylebone Cricket Club
Members of the Privy Council of the United Kingdom
Grooms of the Stool
2
William Ward's XI cricketers